Poraiti is a semi-rural suburb of the city of Napier, in the Hawke's Bay region of New Zealand's eastern North Island.

The area is vulnerable to scrub fires.

Demographics

Poraiti had a population of 2,010 at the 2018 New Zealand census, an increase of 552 people (37.9%) since the 2013 census, and an increase of 1,353 people (205.9%) since the 2006 census. There were 750 households, comprising 981 males and 1,032 females, giving a sex ratio of 0.95 males per female, with 303 people (15.1%) aged under 15 years, 261 (13.0%) aged 15 to 29, 945 (47.0%) aged 30 to 64, and 498 (24.8%) aged 65 or older.

Ethnicities were 90.9% European/Pākehā, 7.0% Māori, 1.0% Pacific peoples, 7.2% Asian, and 1.2% other ethnicities. People may identify with more than one ethnicity.

The percentage of people born overseas was 18.5, compared with 27.1% nationally.

Although some people chose not to answer the census's question about religious affiliation, 48.7% had no religion, 39.6% were Christian, 0.3% were Hindu, 1.5% were Buddhist and 1.0% had other religions.

Of those at least 15 years old, 357 (20.9%) people had a bachelor's or higher degree, and 288 (16.9%) people had no formal qualifications. 396 people (23.2%) earned over $70,000 compared to 17.2% nationally. The employment status of those at least 15 was that 810 (47.5%) people were employed full-time, 273 (16.0%) were part-time, and 33 (1.9%) were unemployed.

Education

References

Suburbs of Napier, New Zealand